The black-spotted parrotfish (Austrolabrus maculatus), also known as the black-spotted wrasse, is a species of wrasse native to the coast of southern Australia, where it is found in inshore waters at depths of from . This species is the only known member of its genus.

References

Labridae
Fish described in 1881